Souls are consciousnesses unique to particular living beings.

Souls may also refer to:

 Souls (band), a Bangladeshi rock music group
 The Souls, a social group

See also

 Soul (disambiguation)
 Soules, a surname